Adrapsa is a genus of moths of the family Erebidae. It was erected by Francis Walker in 1859.

Description
Palpi with second joint reaching above vertex of head. Thorax and abdomen smoothly scaled. Tibia slightly hairy. Forewings with somewhat acute apex. Hindwings with short cell. Veins 3 and 4 usually stalked with stalked vein 6 and 7. Vein 5 from near lower angle of cell.

Species
In alphabetical order:

References

Herminiinae
Noctuoidea genera